Choerophryne swanhildae is a species of frog in the family Microhylidae. It is endemic to Papua New Guinea and is known from the Hagen and Kubor ranges.

Etymology
This species was originally described in the genus Albericus, named for Alberich, the dwarf in Scandinavian mythology and Richard Wagner's opera cycle Der Ring des Nibelungen. Menzies named the species he described after Alberich's companions in the mythodology, in this case Swanhild.

Description
The dorsum is exceptionally warty. The throat is black whereas the belly is grey or spotted. No bright colours are present.

The male advertisement call is a series of very short, bell-like notes. The dominant frequency is about 4 kHz.

Habitat and conservation
The type locality is a Pandanus grove. Development is presumably direct; i.e., there is no free-living larval stage.

This species is quite common. Threats to it are poorly known, but it appears to tolerate some habitat modification from logging. It is not known to occur in any protected area.

References

swanhildae
Amphibians of Papua New Guinea
Amphibians of New Guinea
Endemic fauna of Papua New Guinea
Endemic fauna of New Guinea
Amphibians described in 1999
Taxonomy articles created by Polbot